Biso, also Biiso, is a town in the Western Region of Uganda. It is an urban center in the  Buliisa District Administration. Biiso also refers to a sub-county in Uganda, where the town is located.

Location

The geographical coordinates of Biso, Uganda are 01°45'40.0"N, 31°25'06.0"E (Latitude:1.761111; Longitude:31.418333).

Population
The population of Biiso sub-county, where Biso town s located was enumerated at 17,047 people, during the 2014 national census and household survey.

Overview
Biso is located on the alternate route from Masindi, the nearest large town to Murchison Falls National Park, via Buliisa Town, entering through the Bugungu Gate.

See also
 List of cities and towns in Uganda

References

External links
National Population and Housing Census 2014 Area Specific Profiles: Buliisa District

Populated places in Western Region, Uganda
Buliisa District